The Dr. John B. and Anna M. Hatton House is a historic building located in Des Moines, Iowa, United States.  The house is significant for its suburban architecture in the former suburb of North Des Moines, especially the canted bay subtype of the Stick Style with Italianate influence.  This 2½-story frame structure on a brick foundation features a hip roof with intersecting gables, a canted bay tower on the southeast corner, porches on the front and side, and a two-story bay window on the south elevation.   The house was individually listed on the National Register of Historic Places in 1998.  It was included as a contributing property in the Polk County Homestead and Trust Company Addition Historic District in 2016.

References 

Houses completed in 1887
Stick-Eastlake architecture in Iowa
Houses in Des Moines, Iowa
National Register of Historic Places in Des Moines, Iowa
Houses on the National Register of Historic Places in Iowa
Individually listed contributing properties to historic districts on the National Register in Iowa
1887 establishments in Iowa